Novosibirsk Metro Bridge is a metro bridge over the Ob River in Novosibirsk, Russia. It connects the stations Studencheskaya and Rechnoy Vokzal of the Leninskaya Line of the Novosibirsk Metro. It is the longest covered metro bridge in the world.

History
Novosibirsk Metro Bridge was opened on 7 January 1986.

External links
 Adventures awaiting tourists in Novosibirsk. Russia Beyond.
 History of Novosibirsk Metro. Metroworld. 
 Рекордные достопримечательности Новосибирска. РИА Новости. 
 Новосибирский метрополитен: год хороших новостей. Рамблер. 

Novosibirsk Metro
Bridges in Novosibirsk
Bridges completed in 1986
Bridges over the Ob River